Eliel Peretz (born 18 November 1996) is an Israeli professional footballer who plays as a midfielder for Hapoel Haifa.

Early life
Peretz was born in Bat Yam, Israel, to a Sephardic Jewish family.

Club career
On 19 June 2020, Peretz signed a two-year contract with Austrian club, Wolfsberger AC.

Career statistics

Club

Notes

References

1996 births
Living people
Israeli Sephardi Jews
Israeli footballers
Jewish footballers
Israel under-21 international footballers
Maccabi Tel Aviv F.C. players
Bnei Yehuda Tel Aviv F.C. players
Hapoel Hadera F.C. players
Wolfsberger AC players
Hapoel Haifa F.C. players
Footballers from Bat Yam
Israeli Premier League players
Austrian Football Bundesliga players
Expatriate footballers in Austria
Israeli expatriate sportspeople in Austria
Association football midfielders
Israeli Mizrahi Jews